Chong Kumdang Ri (or Chong Kumdang Ri I & II) are two of the highest mountains in the mountain group which are located in the north of Mamostong Kangri in Rimo Karakoram sub-range in the west of the Transhimalaya.

Location

Chong Kumdang Ri massif has two prominent peaks.

References 

Mountains of the Transhimalayas
Seven-thousanders of the Transhimalayas
Mountains of Ladakh